There are twelve stadiums in use by Midwest League baseball teams. The oldest stadium is Modern Woodmen Park (1931) in Davenport, Iowa, home of the Quad Cities River Bandits. The newest stadium is ABC Supply Stadium in Beloit, Wisconsin, home of the Beloit Sky Carp. One stadium was built in the 1930s, one in the 1980s, three in the 1990s, six in the 2000s, and one in the 2020s. The highest seating capacity is 11,000 at Jackson Field in Lansing, Michigan, where the Lansing Lugnuts play. The lowest capacity is 3,850 at ABC Supply Stadium.

Stadiums

Map

Gallery

Former stadiums

See also

List of High-A baseball stadiums
List of Northwest League stadiums
List of South Atlantic League stadiums

References

General reference

External links

Midwest League
Midwest League stadiums